Sir Thomas Hanmer, 2nd Baronet (1612–1678) was an English politician who sat in the House of Commons  in 1640 and from 1669 to 1678. He was a Royalist during the English Civil War and raised troops for Charles I. In his personal life, he was a keen horticulturist. He is not to be confused with Sir Thomas Hanmer, 2nd Baronet (1747–1828) of the second creation, nor with his grandson, Sir Thomas Hanmer, 4th Baronet.

Life
Hanmer was born in 1612, the eldest son of Sir John Hanmer, 1st Baronet. His father was a Member of Parliament for Flintshire and tended towards the Puritan side of Parliament. Hanmer was a page to Charles I from 1625 to 1627, and became the king's cupbearer. He was interested in horticulture and corresponded with other gardeners.

With the death of his father, Hanmer inherited the Hanmer Baronetage, becoming the 2nd Baronet Hanmer. In April 1640, Hanmer was elected Member of Parliament for Flint Boroughs in the Short Parliament. Despite his uncle, Roger Hanmer, supporting Parliament during the Civil War, Thomas was a Royalist and was the cup-bearer of Charles I of England; and Charles proposed to his nephew, Prince Rupert that Hanmer be made vice-president of Wales.

In 1669 Hanmer gained his second Parliamentary seat when he was elected as member for Flintshire, which he held until his death in 1678.

Family
Hanmer was married twice: his first marriage was to Elizabeth Baker, who eloped with the eccentric pamphleteer the Hon. Thomas Hervey, a son of John Hervey, 1st Earl of Bristol; there were two surviving children of this marriage: a son John, who succeeded him as 3rd Baronet: and a daughter, Trevor (1636-1670), who married Sir John Warner (1640-1705) of Parham, Sussex, who both converted to Catholicism; she became a Carthusian nun.

Thomas Hamner married secondly Susan Hervey, daughter of Sir William Hervey, MP for Bury St. Edmunds. Of this marriage his son, William (born circa 1648 in Angers, Anjou, France), aged 15 went to Pembroke College, Oxford; he married Peregrina, daughter and co-heiress of Sir Sir Henry North, 1st Baronet, of Mildenhall, Essex. Their children were Susanna (16 August 1676 – 23 September 1744), who married Sir Henry Bunbury of Rake Hall, Little Stanney, Cheshire; and Thomas, later 4th Baronet. John, the 3rd baronet died without issue in 1701; his younger brother William having already predeceased their father (the 2nd Baronet), William's son Thomas succeeded to the baronetcy.

A daughter, Thomasin, married Robert Booth and died without issue on 14 May 1712.

References

Sources
thepeerage.com

|-

1612 births
1678 deaths
Baronets in the Baronetage of England
Members of the Parliament of England (pre-1707) for constituencies in Wales
Cavaliers
Welsh horticulturists
English MPs 1640 (April)
English MPs 1661–1679